NCHS may refer to:

 National Center for Health Statistics, a center of the US Centers for Disease Control and Prevention (CDC)
 Nan Chiau High School, Singapore
 Naperville Central High School
 Natrona County High School in Casper, Wyoming
 Nebraska City High School in Nebraska City, Nebraska
 New Canaan High School in New Canaan, Connecticut
 New Castle High School (disambiguation), a disambiguation page listing multiple High Schools of that name.
 Newcomer Charter High School, now Liberty High School (Houston, Texas)
Newton-Conover High School, in Newton, North Carolina
 Normal Community High School in Normal, Illinois
 North County High School (disambiguation), a disambiguation page listing multiple High Schools of that name.
 Northwest Christian High School (Lacey, Washington)
 North Central High School (disambiguation), a disambiguation page listing multiple High Schools of that name.
 The Northern California Herpetological Society
 North Cobb High School